HaAh HaGadol 8 (lit. The Big Brother 8) is the eighth season of the Israeli version of the reality show Big Brother. It's the final season in Keshet. The season began broadcasting on 18 December 2016 and finished at 28 March 2017.

Housemates

Anastasia
 Anastasia Tal 23, Netanya (originally from Belarus).

Avihai 
 Avihai  Ohana 27, Eilat.

Dan
 Dan Rushansky 28, Tel Aviv (originally from Herzliya).

Eden
 Eden Saban 21, Ashdod (originally from Sde Uziyahu).

Ester
 Ester Liberzon Namer 36, Kfar Saba (originally from Lehavim).

Haim
 Haim Shuei 25, Beit She'an.

Hezi
 Hezi Haim 35, Tel Aviv (originally from Rehovot).

Indal
 Indal Kabada 25, Ashdod.

Jodi
 Jodi Amer 24, Jerusalem (originally from Norway).

Kokhav
 Kokhav Perry Sapan 56, Givataim.

Maayan
 Maayan Ashkenazi 25, Herzliya.

Omer
 Omer Gordon 36, Haifa.

Orna
 Orna Danino 38, Petah Tikva (originally from Bnei Brak).

Shani
 Shani Goldshtein 25, Tel Aviv.

Sharon
 Sharon Gal 42, Giv'at Shmuel.

Shem
 Shem Bardugo 30, Tel Aviv.

Shmulik
 Shmulik Sapan 58, Givataim (originally from Tirat Carmel).

Talin
 Talin Abu Hana 21, Tel Aviv (originally from Nazareth).

Tehila
 Tehila Asudry 32, Ramat Gan (originally from Netanya, Los Angeles & New York City).

Nominations table

Notes 

 Maayan won the Big Brother Games, she is no longer nominated. She nominated Tehila for eviction.
 As Head of House, Hezi was immune. He nominated 'poor group' housemates for eviction.
 Maayan won the Big Brother Games, she is no longer nominated. She nominated Eden for eviction.
 Orna won the Big Brother Games, she is no longer nominated. She nominated Shmulik & Kokhav for eviction.
 Eden won the Big Brother Games, she is no longer nominated. She nominated Maayan for eviction.
 Shani won the Big Brother Games, she is no longer nominated. She nominated Haim for eviction.
 On Day 59, Anastasia, Jodi, Omer, Sharon entered the house. As new housemates, they cannot be nominated.
 Shani won the Big Brother Games, she is no longer nominated. She nominated Avihai for eviction.
 Shani won the Big Brother Games, she is no longer nominated. She nominated Avihai for eviction.
 Omer won the Big Brother Games, he is no longer nominated.
 Omer won the Big Brother Games, he is no longer nominated. He nominated Haim for eviction.

Nominations totals received

References

External links
  

2016 Israeli television seasons
2017 Israeli television seasons
08